Mačkov is a municipality and village in Strakonice District in the South Bohemian Region of the Czech Republic. It has about 300 inhabitants.

Geography
It lies in the Blatná Uplands. The municipality forms an enclave in the territory of Blatná.

References

Villages in Strakonice District